June Carlson (April 16, 1924 – December 9, 1996) was an American film actress.

Early years
A native of Los Angeles, Carlson was the daughter of Hjalmas Carlson and Carrie Rogers Carlson.

Film
Carlson began her career as a child actress, appearing in the role of Lucy Jones in Twentieth Century Fox's Jones Family series of films. Once she was older, she appeared in two exploitation films Delinquent Daughters and Mom and Dad. Her final film was the 1948 western The Hawk of Powder River. She then married and retired from acting.

Personal life
On June 2, 1945, Carlson married Donald C. McKean, a movie producer. She "left Hollywood ... to raise her three children and later worked in a department store cosmetics section."

Death
Carlson died of an aneurysm in San Clemente, California, December 9, 1996.

Selected filmography
 Every Saturday Night  (1936)
 Educating Father (1936)
 Back to Nature (1936)
 Checkers (1937)
 The Jones Family in Big Business (1937)
 Hot Water (1937)
 A Trip to Paris (1938)
 Quick Millions (1939)
 Delinquent Daughters (1944)
 Mom and Dad (1945)
 Come Out Fighting (1945)
 The Hawk of Powder River (1948)

References

Further reading
 Dye, David. Child and Youth Actors: Filmography of Their Entire Careers, 1914-1985. Jefferson, NC: McFarland & Co., 1988, p. 31.
 Bernard A. Drew. Motion Picture Series and Sequels: A Reference Guide. Routledge, 2013.

External links

1924 births
1996 deaths
American film actresses
Actresses from Los Angeles
20th-century American actresses
Deaths from aneurysm